Lilian Diedericks (17 December 1925 in Port Elizabeth, Red Location – 21 December 2021 in Port Elizabeth) was a South African activist known as a founding member of the Federation of South African Women.

She was an active shop steward and co-founded the Federation of South African Women in 1954. Her family was forced out of New Brighton during the 1940s. She was one of the four women who led the Women's March on the Union buildings to oppose the pass laws in 1956.

Diedericks was an active trade unionist, leader of South African Congress of Trade Unions and South African Communist Party member.

She was also one of the four women who led the Women’s March on the Union buildings to oppose the pass laws in 1956 along with struggle icons Rahima Moosa, Helen Joseph, Lilian Ngoyi and Sophia De Bruyn. After a protest against the mayor of Port Elizabeth in 1956, Diedericks was arrested for treason, along with Frances Baard and Florence Matomela

They were imprisoned at the Fort in Johannesburg and acquitted in 1961. Diedericks was banned by the apartheid government, from 1967 to 1968.
 
The municipal house Brister House in Port Elizabeth was renamed the Lilian Diedericks Building in 2009. Lilian Diedericks lives in Gelvandale, Port Elizabeth.

She died on the 21 December 2021 in her house in Port Elizabeth.

Honours
The Red Location Museum in New Brighton held a year-long exhibition dedicated to these women of the liberation struggle, by paying tribute to Florence Matomela, Nontuthuzelo Mabala, Veronica Sobukwe, Lilian Diedricks and Nosipho Dastile.

On April 28, 2018, Diedricks was honored by the National Orders of Pretoria for her activism.

References

1925 births
2021 deaths
South African activists
Members of the Order of Luthuli
South African women activists
South African trade unionists
Members of the South African Communist Party
South African prisoners and detainees
People from Port Elizabeth